Chesterfield Motion Picture Corporation, generally shortened to Chesterfield Pictures, was an American film production company of the 1920s and 1930s. The company head was George R. Batcheller, and the company worked in tandem with its sister studio, Invincible, which was led by Maury Cohen. The production company never owned its own studio and rented space at other studios, primarily Universal Pictures and RKO.

Batcheller's target market was neighborhood theaters that weren't part of the big studios' theater chains. These smaller houses usually showed second- or third-run movies, and couldn't afford to show the newest, expensive feature films. Batcheller serviced these smaller theaters with smaller movies: low-budget productions that cost theater owners much less than big-studio attractions, and could play first-run. This was an ambitious policy in the days before double features and "B" pictures, when individual movies were featured as the main attraction in movie theaters. Given Chesterfield's budget constraints, Batcheller could not afford to pay the high salaries commanded by major-studio performers, and relied on less expensive "name" talent (former stars of the silent screen, or currently established featured players). He also relied on a small staff of busy directors: Frank R. Strayer, Richard Thorpe, Phil Rosen, and Charles Lamont.

Chesterfield was one of a number of Poverty Row studios taken over by Herbert Yates in 1935 and merged into his newly formed Republic Pictures, in an attempt to create a studio with enough strength and appeal to compete with the major studios. Republic achieved this goal and lasted more than 20 years.

George Batcheller died in 1938. In 1941 his son, George R. Batcheller, Jr., became head of the PRC studio and used his father's Chesterfield strategy there.

See also
 List of Chesterfield Pictures films

References

Bibliography
 Balio Tino. Grand Design: Hollywood as a Modern Business Entertprise 1930-1939. University of California Press, 1995.
 Pitts, Michael R. Poverty Row Studios, 1929–1940: An Illustrated History of 55 Independent Film Companies, with a Filmography for Each. McFarland & Company, 2005.

American film studios
Film production companies of the United States